Mahmudiyeh-ye Bahrami (also Romanized as Maḩmūdīyeh-ye Bahrāmī and Maḩmūdīyeh Bahrāmī; also known as Mahmūdi, Maḩmūdīyeh, and Moḩammadī) is a village in Azadegan Rural District, in the Central District of Rafsanjan County, Kerman Province, Iran. At the 2006 census, its population was 337, in 76 families.

References 

Populated places in Rafsanjan County